Sulkhan Fyodorovich Tsintsadze, (August 23, 1925 in Gori, Transcaucasian SSR, Soviet Union – September 15, 1991 in Tbilisi, Georgia) was one of Georgia's foremost composers.

Education

Tsintsadze studied the cello until 1942 with E.N. Kapelniski in Tbilisi at the Gymnasium of Music. He furthered his studies of the cello at the Conservatory of Tbilisi with K. Minjar. From the years 1945 to 1953 he went to the Moscow Conservatory to study the cello with Semyon Matveyevich Kozolupov and composition with Semyon Semyonovich Bogatyryov.

Career

He began his musical career in the 1940s as the cellist in the Georgian State String Quartet. His first composition, based on Georgian folk songs and being a collection of miniatures for string quartet, was an immediate success. He also wrote several operas, ballets, symphonies and concertos, but it was his compositions for string quartet which came to take pride of place amongst his works and which made a notable contribution to Georgian music. Tsintsadze's compositions are based on the traditional forms as well as styles and characteristics used by composers such as Shostakovich and Shebalin. Georgian folklore is ever present in his music.

Sulkhan Tsintsadze was one of Georgia's leading composers. He was awarded the People's Artist of Georgia (1961) and People's Artist of the USSR (1987) titles, and was a holder of the USSR Stalin Prize (1950), Zakharia Paliashvili Prize (1977), and Shota Rustaveli Prize (1981).

Works
His Sixth Quartet constitutes one of Tsintsadze's finest creations: on the one hand, it represents the culmination in the development and maturation of the composer's individual style; on the other, it reflects his continued search for new means of expression. A composition consisting of one movement yet divided into five structurally open sections, with its development based on monothematic techniques that serve to integrate the parts into a whole, this quartet is written in a form close to that of rondo-sonata, with a prominent role being given to variational continuation. The first section, marked Andante sostenuto, in which the theme is expounded, is wrought with emotion; in the ensuing Allegro assai the musical development is of a dramatic intensity that finds its culmination in the fugato; in the third section, also marked Andante sostenuto, the theme, filled with concealed sorrow, moves from sighs of lament to a rhythmic acceleration; in the Allegro scherzando, which sounds not unlike a grotesque and fantastic dance, the theme is subjected to a number of contrapuntal devices; finally, in the Andante molto sostenuto, the theme returns in its tragic colouring, as if posing a question to which there comes no reply.

Filmography
 1992 Oqros oboba (TV Series) 
 1983 Jadosnuri game 
 1975 Chitis rdze (TV Movie) 
 1973 Levan Khidasheli 
 1969 Look at These Young People! 
 1965 Father of a Soldier 
 1963 Tojinebi itsinian 
 1962 Khelmarjve ostati - Sportsmeni (Short) 
 1962 Tkhunela 
 1962 Zgvis biliki 
 1961 Treasure 
 1960 Gantiadi (Short) 
 1959 Maia Tskneteli 
 1958 Otaraant qvrivi (as S. Tsintsdaze) 
 1958 A Woman's Burden
 1956 The Scrapper 
 1956 Bashi-Achuki 
 1956 Chrdili gzaze 
 1954 Niko da Nikora (Short) 
 1954 The Dragonfly 
 1953 Patara takhvi chuka (Short)

Compositions

 Three Miniatures for string quartet (1945) Duration: 6'
   Lale
   Indi-Mindi
   Sachidao
 String Quartet No. 1 (1947) 28'
 Cello Concerto No. 1 (1947) 20'
 Violin Concerto No. 1 (1947)
 Two Pieces for viola and piano (1948) 7'
   Khorumi, Georgian Dance
   Romance
 String Quartet No. 2 (1948) 28'
 Piano Concerto No. 1 after Georgian Themes (1949) 20'
 Fantasy for piano and orchestra (revision of Piano Concerto No. 1) (1949) 12'
 Five Pieces on Folk Themes for cello and piano (1950) Duration: 10'
   Villain's Song on a Carriage
   Tchonguri (Chonguri) 
   Sachidao
   Nana
   Dance Tune
 String Quartet No. 3 (1951) 30'
 Suite for string quartet (1951) 15'
 Symphony No. 1 (1952) 28'
 The Golden Fleece, opera after the saga of the argonauts (1953); libretto by Ira Gelovani. 130'
 Fantasy for piano and orchestra (1954) Duration: 20'
 The Treasure of the Blue Mountain, children's ballet in three acts (1954); libretto by Ira Gelovani. 100'
 Suite from the ballet "The Treasure of the Blue Mountain" (1954)
 Music to the Film "The Dragon-Fly" (1954)
 Suite from the music to the Film "The Dragon-Fly" (1954) 18'
 String Quartet No. 4 (1955) 30'
 Suite No. 3 for string quartet (1955) 15'
 Farewell-Song, cantata after Yelena Drushima for solo voices, chorus and orchestra (1956)
 Demon, ballet in three acts after Michail Lermontov (1958); libretto by V. Tsabukiani; first performance in 1961 in Tbilisi. 130'
 Suite from the ballet "Demon" (1958) 30'
 Seventeen Miniatures for string quartet (1961) 40'
 String Quartet No. 5 (1962) 32'
 Symphony No. 2 (1963)
 The Spider's Web, operetta (1963)
 Cello Concerto No. 2 (1964) 36'
 Georgian Melodies for cello and piano (1967) 26'
 String Quartet No. 6 (1967) 18'30"
 Singing in the Forest, operetta (1967); libretto by Lewan Tsubabrya
 Violin Concerto No. 2 (1967) 28'
 Piano Concerto No. 2 (1968)
 Symphony No. 3 (1969) 25'
 Immortality, oratorio after M. Pozshivili for mezzo-soprano, chorus and orchestra (1969) 34'
 String Quartet No. 7 "To the Memory of Bela Bartok" (1970)
 Twenty-Four Preludes for piano (1971) 45'
 The Hermit, opera in one act after Ilja Tshavtshavadze (1972); libretto by Pjotr Grusinsky; first performance in 1972 in Tbilisi. 45'
 Antique Sketches, ballet in one act after Georgi Aleksidze (1973)
 Cello Concerto No. 3 (1973)
 Five Romances after Pjotr Grusinsky for high voice and piano (1974)
 String Quartet No. 8 (1974) 18'
 Schweyk against Frans Joseph, operetta (1974)
 The Milkstreet, cantata after Pjotr Grusinsky for soprano, chorus and orchestra (1975) 20'
 Suite from the ballet Antique Sketches (1975)
 Dali and the Hunters, ballet (1975); libretto by Georgi Aleksidze
 Sonata for cello solo (1975)
 Concertino for cello and orchestra (1976) 30'
 Fantasy for string quartet and orchestra (1977)
 String Quartet No. 9 (1978); dedicated to the memory of Dmitri Shostakovich
 Twelve Miniatures for string quartet (1978) 30'
 Twenty-Four Preludes for violin, celesta, piano, bells and chamber orchestra (1978)
 Twelve Children Songs after Chuta Berulav for voice and piano (1979)
 Twelve Children's Pieces for piano (1979)
 Symphony No. 4 (1979)
 Twenty-Four Preludes for cello and piano (1980)
 String Quartet No. 10 "Polyphonic" (1984)
 String Quartet No. 11 (1986)
 Eight Miniatures on Georgian Folk Tunes for string quartet (1988)
 Ballad of a Soldier, Requiem (1988)
 Fantasy after themes from Dolidze's opera "Keto and Kote" for violin and strings (1989)
 Five Miniatures on Jewish Folk Tunes for string quartet (1990)
 Fantasy on Themes from Gershwin's "Porgy and Bess" for violin and chamber orchestra (1991)
 String Quartet No. 12 (1991)
 And furthermore:
 Pieces for chamber orchestra
 Choruses
 Incidental Music
 Film Music

His major works are:
 12 string quartets and miniatures for quartet (1947-1991)
 Two operas ("Gandegili" 1972)
 Five ballets ("Demon" 1961, "Rivares" 1982)
 Five symphonies (1952-1985)
 24 preludes for cello and orchestra (1980) and violin and orchestra (1987)
 2 concertos for piano and orchestra
 Concertino for cello and chamber orchestra
 2 concertos for cello and orchestra
 2 concertos for violin and orchestra
 3 operettas ("ablabuda" - 1960, "simgera tkeshi" - 1967, "shveiki" - 1976)
 Five Pieces for cello and piano
 A lot of film-music

External links 
Listen Online to Sulkhan Tsintsadze's music

People's Artists of the USSR
Classical cellists from Georgia (country)
Classical composers from Georgia (country)
Opera composers from Georgia (country)
People from Gori, Georgia
1925 births
1991 deaths
Moscow Conservatory alumni
People's Artists of Georgia
Stalin Prize winners
20th-century classical composers
Male classical composers
Male opera composers
20th-century male musicians
20th-century cellists